Oorpally is a small village near Koyileri, Mananthavady on the banks of the river Kabini in the Wayanad district of Kerala state, south India.

Agriculture is the main stay of the economy. Coffee, black pepper and vanilla are the main cash crops.

People
 Kurichiyans
 Adiyas
 Nairs
 Jains
 Christians

River
 Kabni River 
The Kabini or Kabani is a river of southern India. It originates in Wayanad District of Kerala state, south India from the confluence of the Panamaram River.

Access
 The Mananthavady - Panamaram  Highway passes through Oorpally Village.  Buses go frequently between important centres.
 The Mananthavady - Payyampally - Pulpally road.
 Nearest hospital - Mananthavady district Hospital.
 Nearest ATM - Mananthavady (Federal Bank of India, State Bank of India).

Nearest Schools
 Arattuthara Government High school.
 Payyampally School.

Religious place
 Valliyoorkav

Transportation
Oorpally village can be accessed from Mananthavady or Kalpetta. The Periya ghat road connects Mananthavady to Kannur and Thalassery.  The Thamarassery mountain road connects Calicut with Kalpetta. The Kuttiady mountain road connects Vatakara with Kalpetta and Mananthavady. The Palchuram mountain road connects Kannur and Iritty with Mananthavady.  The road from Nilambur to Ooty is also connected to Wayanad through the village of Meppadi.

The nearest railway station is at Mysore and the nearest airports are Kozhikode International Airport-120 km, Bengaluru International Airport-290 km, and   Kannur International Airport, 58 km.

See also 
 Mananthavady 
 Thondernad
 Vellamunda
 Nalloornad
Payyampally
Thavinjal
Vimalanager
Anjukunnu
Panamaram
Tharuvana
Kallody
Valat
Thrissilery

References

Villages in Wayanad district
Mananthavady Area